Cardiocondyla nuda is a species of ant in the subfamily Myrmicinae. It is a widespread ant species, and not invasive in nature.

Subspecies
 Cardiocondyla nuda fajumensis Forel, 1913
 Cardiocondyla nuda nuda Mayr, 1866 - See below
 Cardiocondyla nuda sculptinodis Santschi, 1913 - Madagascar
 Cardiocondyla nuda shuckardoides Forel, 1895
 Cardiocondyla nuda strigifrons Viehmeyer, 1922

Distribution
Australia, Cook Islands, Fiji, Hawaii, Kiribati, Solomon Islands, Tonga, Vanuatu, Dominican Republic, Mexico, Galapagos Islands, Puerto Rico, Bangladesh, New Guinea, India, Thailand, Sri Lanka, Vietnam, Afghanistan, China, Israel, Japan, Republic of Korea.

References

External links

 at antwiki.org
PIAkey
Itis.gov

Myrmicinae
Hymenoptera of Asia
Insects described in 1866